Tanx is a 1973 album by rock band T. Rex, the eighth since their debut as Tyrannosaurus Rex in 1968, and the fourth under the moniker T. Rex. It was released on 16 March by record label EMI. Tanx was a musical departure from previous works: still containing tracks in the vein of The Slider, singer and songwriter Marc Bolan showed his interest for soul music, funk and gospel. Female backing singers appeared on a few tracks. New instruments such as mellotron were used, played by producer Tony Visconti, allowing the T. Rex sound to evolve.

Upon its release, Tanx was a commercial success. It peaked at number 4 in the UK Albums chart, number 3 in the German Albums chart and number 5 in Norway.  No singles were released to promote the album.

History and music
The recording sessions first took place in France in August, and then in October 1972 after the American tour. In the US, the band had appeared on stage, accompanied with female soulful backing singers on a few dates. Bolan recorded the piano based song "Left Hand Luke and the Beggar Boys" with gospel backup female vocals, Madeline Bell, Lesley Duncan, Vicky Brown, Barry St John and Sue and Sunny. They doubled Bolan on the soulful choruses but were not credited on the sleeve. Bob Stanley of the Times described "Left Hand Luke and the Beggar Boys" as a "New Orleans bar piano" song, with "interstellar soul". "The Street and Babe Shadow" with saxophone as one of the main instruments, showed Bolan adding a funky side into his music. "Life is Strange" and "Broken Hearted Blues" were ballads closer to the T. Rex sound while "Shock Rock" was a boogie track.

Bolan wanted to get away from the traditional T. Rex. He spent time in the studio to overdub all the instruments and add effects. The opening number " Tenement Lady" allowed the band to use a mellotron, played by producer Tony Visconti, and Bolan used a phased effect on his vocals.

Release 
Tanx was released on 16 March 1973 by record label EMI in the UK and Reprise in the US. Tanx was a top 4 hit in the UK Albums Chart and a hit all over Europe, peaking at number 3 in Germany, number 5 in Norway, number 15 in Sweden, and number 20 in Finland, but it failed to match the success of The Slider in the US, reaching only No. 102 in the Billboard 200. Curiously, the popular single "20th Century Boy" recorded during a stay in Japan, and released two weeks before, on 2 March 1973, was not included on the album, which may have affected sales, as the album (unlike its two predecessors) did not include any single. 

Tanx was remastered for CD over and over again, beginning in 1985 on the Marc On Wax and  label. This first reissue came with all of T. Rex's non-album singles and B-Sides released in 1973 as well as the tracks released under the Big Carrot moniker. Edsel Records re-released the album in 1994 as part of their extensive T. Rex reissue campaign with a different set of bonus tracks. A companion release, entitled Left Hand Luke (The Alternative Tanx), was released in 1995 and contained alternative versions, studio rough mixes and demos of the main album and bonus tracks. A combined album digipak was released in 2002. In 2003, further recordings from the Tanx sessions were released by Thunderwing Productions Limited (TPL), the owners of several original ¼", 1" and 2" Master Tape recordings of Marc Bolan & T. Rex. These tracks were released as The Tanx Recordings.

Reception 

At the time, Tanx received favourable reviews in both the NME and Record Mirror.  Creem hailed it saying, "song for song, this might be Marc Bolan's strongest album. Certainly, it's the most varied, and the most musical". However, it was derided by Rolling Stone: reviewer Paul Gambaccini wrote "This one album might have made a good EP [...] I can't see many people being truly pleased with it. But I've been wrong before." He nevertheless praised tracks like "Mister Mister,"  "Electric Slim and the Factory Hen," and "Broken Hearted Blues."

Retrospective reviews have been more favourable. Whitney Strub of PopMatters wrote "One reason for Tanx's commercial failure was its lack of the immediacy for which glam was known. [...] But what doomed the album on the charts is precisely what earns it reinspection today: the songs, for the most part, flow cohesively from one fractured mini-narrative to the next". Stephen M. Deusner of Pitchfork, whilst praising the record, called it "a difficult album". The Quietus wrote "It's an excessive record in the best possible sense", qualifying "Tenement Lady" as a stunning opener. Neil Kulkarni considered that "Electric Slim & The Factory Hen" was a nod to black soul music, a style that Bolan had always wanted to explore: Kulkarni wrote that this was two years before David Bowie "tried the same move on Young Americans".

Legacy
AllMusic wrote that it presaged David Bowie's soul music phase: "It was admirable that Bolan was attempting to broaden the T. Rex sound -- soulful backup singers and horns are heard throughout, a full two years before David Bowie used the same formula for his mega-seller Young Americans". 

Tanx inspired Suede for their Coming Up album as producer Ed Buller related: "The blueprint was Tanx by T.Rex – I actually thought The Slider was a better choice, but Brett (Anderson) always had a different take on things. I always looked at The Slider as being the ultimate T.Rex album, but he’s right, Tanx is actually a better record, because it’s more interesting. Basically, what we did, is that every track started with acoustic guitar, bongos, tambourine and Brett, so it all started life pretty much the same way that Marc Bolan recorded all of his stuff originally. He started with an acoustic guitar song and then he’d build it up with guitar and drums and electronics. So the foundation of the songs on Coming Up, is a groove made-up out of congas, tambourine and acoustic guitar." In 2003, Martin Gore from Depeche Mode recorded in solo two covers from Tanx as extra-tracks of his single "Stardust":  "Left Hand Luke and the Beggar Boys", and "Life is Strange".

The song "Life is Strange" was the soundtrack of several scenes of the film Dallas Buyers Club in 2013 in which one of the main characters, Rayon, a Marc Bolan fan played by Jared Leto, lived surrounded with pictures of his idol.

Track listing

Personnel 
T.Rex
 Marc Bolan – vocals, guitar
 Mickey Finn – conga, hand percussion, vocals
 Steve Currie – bass
 Bill Legend – drums
with:
 Flo & Eddie – backing vocals
 Tony Visconti – mellotron, string arrangements, backing vocals, recorder, producer
 Howard Casey – saxophone

Technical
John Kosh - cover design
Peter Howe - front cover photography

Charts

Weekly charts

Year-end charts

References

External links 

 

1973 albums
T. Rex (band) albums
Albums arranged by Tony Visconti
Albums produced by Tony Visconti
EMI Records albums